Atsuta can refer several different Japanese locations:
Atsuta-ku, Nagoya
Atsuta Jingu (shrine)
Atsuta, Hokkaido